The following is a list of international ice hockey competitions where National Hockey League players have been able to participate. Most of these competitions were arranged by the NHL or NHLPA. There have been 14 full international tournaments where it was possible for all NHL players to participate since the 1976 Canada Cup, dubbed as the first real World Championship. There are 5 Canada Cups, 3 World Cups of Hockey, 5 Winter Olympics and 2005 IIHF World Championship. Canada won 9 tournaments. Czech Republic won twice. USA, Sweden and Soviet Union each won once.

Summit Series 

The Summit Series was an eight-game challenge series between the Soviet National Team and a Canadian professional team.

In the 1972 Summit Series, the Canadian team was made up of NHL hockey players.  No World Hockey Association players were included in the event.  Two years later, Canadian WHA players competed in the 1974 Summit Series and were defeated by the Soviets. No active NHL players participated in the series; there were however, some former NHLers that played for the WHA-composed Canadian team in the series.

Super Series 

The Super Series were exhibition games between Soviet teams and NHL teams that took place on each NHL opponents' home ice in North America from 1976 to 1991. The Soviet teams were usually club teams from the Soviet hockey league. The exception was in 1983, when the Soviet National Team represented the Soviet Union. Soviet teams won 14 series, NHL teams won 2 series, and 2 series were tied.

In the following summary the winner of a series is in bold.

Canada Cup 

The Canada Cup tournament was a major international invitational competition for NHL players before the advent of the World Cup of Hockey.

Challenge Cup 1979

Rendez Vous 1987 

In 1987, two matches were held between the USSR and NHL All Stars in Quebec City, Canada in place of the annual NHL All Star Game. Each team won one game and the series was declared a tie.

Ninety Nine All Stars Tour 

During the 1994–95 NHL lockout the Ninety Nine All Stars Tour was created by Wayne Gretzky and some of his personal friends, who formed a team and toured Europe for a total of eight games against mainly European competition, and playing games in five different countries.

World Cup 

In 1996, the World Cup of Hockey replaced the Canada Cup.

Olympics 

Between 1998 and 2014, the NHL had a break in the season to allow its players to participate in the Olympics.

IIHF World Championships 

Since 1976, there has been no limit to how many NHL players countries can send to the IIHF World Championships, but the tournament is usually played during the NHL playoffs. Because of the NHL lockout in 2004, all NHL players were available to participate in the 2005 Championship. However, many players did not participate because they had not played for a full season, and were therefore not in "game shape."

NHL Challenge 

Between 2000 and 2003, a select few NHL teams traveled to Europe to play exhibition games against top division teams in the Swedish and Finnish leagues.

Victoria Cup 

The Victoria Cup was an ice hockey tournament organized by the IIHF and intended for teams of the Champions Hockey League and the NHL. The inaugural Cup was a single game playoff between the 2008 IIHF European Champions Cup winners Metallurg Magnitogorsk and the New York Rangers of the NHL. It was held in Bern, Switzerland on 1 October 2008. The Rangers won 4-3.

The 2009 edition of the tournament featured the ZSC Lions, the 2008–09 Champions Hockey League winners, and the Chicago Blackhawks of the NHL. The ZSC Lions defeated the Blackhawks 2-1 in the Hallenstadion in Zurich, Switzerland.

KHL vs NHL games

Teams of the former Soviet league did not play against NHL teams after the Super Series ended until 2008, when the 2008 Victoria Cup took place in Bern. In 2010 NHL teams played their first games on Russian and Latvian ice since 1990.

See also 
 International Ice Hockey Federation
 National Hockey League
 Ice Hockey World Championships
 List of international games played by NHL teams

External links 
 Hockey Hall of Fame's Summary of Super Series
 Top Level Hockey World Rankings

References 

 
International